Goeppertia louisae (syn. Calathea louisae) is a species of plant belonging to the genus Goeppertia, native to Rio de Janeiro state of southeast Brazil but cultivated in other places as an ornamental.

Goeppertia louisae is an herb up to 80 cm tall. Leaf blades are up to 22 cm long, 10 cm wide, with two different shades of green running in stripes from the costa to the margins.

References

louisae
Endemic flora of Brazil
Flora of Southeast Brazil
Garden plants
Plants described in 1908